Nancy Overton Harrington (May 15, 1926 – May 22, 2020) was an American politician.

Harrington was born in Bay Shore, New York. She went to Fenn College and Kent State University. She was involved in the airline and automobile industries. Harrington owned the Harrington Auto Imports in Cleveland, Ohio. She served as an administrative aide in Tallahassee, Florida. Harrington served in the Florida House of Representatives, from 1974 to 1976, from Coral Gables, Florida, and was a Democrat.

Notes

1926 births
2020 deaths
People from Bay Shore, New York
People from Coral Gables, Florida
Businesspeople from Cleveland
Cleveland State University alumni
Kent State University alumni
Women state legislators in Florida
Democratic Party members of the Florida House of Representatives
Businesspeople from New York (state)
20th-century American businesspeople
20th-century American businesswomen
20th-century American politicians
20th-century American women politicians
21st-century American women